Thomas Patrick Nolan (11 December 1876 – 27 May 1930) was an Australian rules footballer who played with Fitzroy in the Victorian Football League (VFL).

Nolan joined Fitzroy for the 1899 VFL season and made his senior debut in Round 10, against Geelong. After one more match in the seniors, in Round 11, Nolan returned to the reserves and did not play another senior game.

Nolan become a lawyer and was also a state champion race walker.  His brothers Bernie, Jerry and Herb also played football in the VFL.

Nolan died on 27 May 1930 of heart failure in Epworth Hospital in Richmond, Victoria. He left a widow.

Sources

External links

1876 births
1930 deaths
Fitzroy Football Club players
Australian rules footballers from Melbourne
People from Wyndham Vale, Victoria